Francesco Angelo "Frank" Alban (born 14 November 1949) is a former Western Australian politician. He was born in Ostiglia, Italy, and arrived in Western Australia in February 1956. He was a Liberal Party member of the Western Australian Legislative Assembly from 2008 to 2017, representing Swan Hills. He won the seat after the retirement of sitting Labor MLA Jaye Radisich.

Since November 2008, Alban has been a member of both the Procedure and Privileges Committee and the Joint Standing Committee on the Corruption and Crime Commission in the WA State Parliament.

References

1949 births
Living people
Members of the Western Australian Legislative Assembly
Liberal Party of Australia members of the Parliament of Western Australia
Italian emigrants to Australia
Australian politicians of Italian descent
21st-century Australian politicians